The Dictionary of Classical Antiquities (1891, revised many times in the 1950s and 60s), covers Ancient Greek and Roman antiquities, mythology and literature in over 2,500 articles.

It was written in German by Oskar Seyffert and edited by Henry Nettleship and John Edwin Sandys.

References

External links
Full text ebook at University of Connecticut Libraries

Classics publications
Encyclopedias of history
German encyclopedias
19th-century encyclopedias
20th-century encyclopedias